Stockmann Helsinki Centre is a culturally significant business building and department store located in the centre of Helsinki, Finland. It is one of many department stores owned by the Stockmann corporation. It is the largest department store in the Nordic countries in terms of area and total sales. The store is known for carrying all the internationally recognised luxury brands, and Stockmann's enjoys a reputation as the primary high-end department store in Finland. Stockmann Delicatessen, the food and beverage department located at the basement level, is renowned for the quality and choice of its foodstuffs. The Stockmann logo represents a set of escalators, which are commonly, but wrongly believed represent the first escalators in Finland. The first escalators in Finland were installed in the Forum department store, Turku (1926).

In 2017, Stockmann Helsinki Centre was the fifth largest department store in Europe with area of 50,500 square meters.

Especially the clock at the main entrance, colloquially "Stockan kello" ("Stocka's clock"), has become a symbol of Helsinkian city culture as a popular meeting place.

Valter Thomé and his brother won the architecture competition for the department store in 1916. The Thomé brothers were killed in the Finnish Civil War. The building was built in 1930, and the task was then given to Sigurd Frosterus who had been on the second place in the original competition. The department store was designed in nordic Art Deco style. It is part of the Gazelle block in the district of Kluuvi. The new expansion of the building is based on Sigurd Frosterus's plans.

Expansions and changes 
In 1989, the Argos house located in the same block was joined into the Stockmann building. During the renovation, only the facade of the Argos house was preserved. Because of this, Stockmann expanded to fill the entire block bordered by the streets of Mannerheimintie, Aleksanterinkatu, Keskuskatu and Pohjoisesplanadi. The department store has seven floors, not counting the basement and the eighth floor, which contains other businesses.

A further expansion of the department store began in 2007. The project was called Kaikkien aikojen Stockmann – Alla tiders Stockmann ("Stockmann of all times"). This was a challenging project, as it took place in the heart of Helsinki, and the department store was functional during the works.

The department store was expanded both underground and at the centre of the store. The atrium was covered, adding  of retail space to the sixth to eighth floors. At the eighth and topmost floor, a food court was added, with seating for 950 customers and views of the lower floors.

In total,  of rock was blown out from underground.

During the building work, the elevator and escalator systems of the old department store were clarified. After the renovation,  40 renovated elevators and escalators are in use. Also, the lighting and air conditioning was improved.

The new garage tripled the parking capacity to 600 cars. The 3-floor hall has connections to Ruoholahdenkatu as part of the central maintenance tunnel, and to the junction of Kalevankatu and Mannerheimintie.

The size of the grocery department was doubled to about 5,000 square meters.

The total capital expenditure on the enlargement part of the project was 198 million euros, in addition to significant repair and renovation work of existing premises. It was projected to increase the annual sales by 50 million Euro.

By 2016, the concept of one large space was old fashioned, and speciality stores had taken a large fraction of the market. Renting space to other businesses was a good business, but the core activity was not profitable. Stockmann started to outsource departments and activities. In 2017, the department store includes a number of shop-in-shop departments and services, such as XS Toys department, SOL Laundry and Nordea bank.

In addition, there are also cafés and restaurants in the department store, such as Classic Pizza, Robert's Coffee, Espresso House, Hesburger, Restaurant Biáng, Nordic Market and Hanko Sushi.

References

External links 

  Stockmann in Brief Stockmann

Landmarks in Finland
Buildings and structures completed in 1930
Shops in Helsinki
Department stores of Finland
Modernist architecture in Finland
Kluuvi